Naden Brook is a watercourse in north west England. It rises in the hills above Norden, near the boundary of Lancashire and Greater Manchester. From here it flows south to Heywood, where it merges with the River Roch.

Tributaries
Cheesden Brook
Kill Gate Brook
Grain Brook
Mill Croft Brook
Old House Brook
Woodhouse Lane Brook
Royds Brook
Red Lumb Brook
Fordoe Brook
Rooley Moor Brook
Birchen Holts Brook
Ding Brook

Rivers of Lancashire
Rivers of Greater Manchester
Rivers of the Metropolitan Borough of Rochdale
1